The Men's points race at the European Track Championships was first competed in 2011 in the Netherlands.

A lap ahead of the other riders is worth 20 points.

Medalists

References

2011 Results
2012 Results

 
Men's points race
Men's points race